El Espacio (meaning "The Space") is a Colombian newspaper from Bogotá.

History and profile
El Espacio was founded in 1965 by Ciro Gomez Mejia. The paper is headquartered in Bogota. Due to financial difficulties, technological changes in recent decades, strong competition from free newspapers and lower prices, the newspaper was last circulated on 23 November 2013. However, since August 2014, an online version is available on El Espacio's official website.

References

1965 establishments in Colombia
Newspapers established in 1965
Newspapers published in Colombia
Spanish-language newspapers
Spanish-language websites